Arctia subnebulosa is a moth of the family Erebidae. It was described by Harrison Gray Dyar Jr. in 1899. It is found in Alaska, Yukon and the Russian Far East.

This species was formerly a member of the genus Pararctia, but was moved to Arctia along with the other species of the genera Acerbia, Pararctia, Parasemia, Platarctia, and Platyprepia.

Subspecies
Arctia subnebulosa subnebulosa (Alaska, Yukon)
Arctia subnebulosa tundrana Tshistjakov, 1990 (Polar Urals, Yamal, Gydan, Taymyr, Polar Yakutia, Chukotka, northern Koryakia)

References

Arctiina
Moths described in 1899